Polish National Committee was formed in Lausanne on 15 August 1917 by Polish National Democracy politician Roman Dmowski. Its goal was to support the Entente by creating a Polish Army (the Blue Army under Józef Haller), to fight alongside it in exchange of support for an independent Poland. In addition to Dmowski its chief activists included Ignacy Jan Paderewski, August Zaleski, Erazm Piltz, Marian Seyda and Maurycy Zamoyski. In September 1917, the Polish National Committee was recognized by the French as the legitimate representative of Poland. The British and the Americans were less enthusiastic about Dmowski's National Committee, but likewise recognized it as representing Polish interests in 1918. In January 1919 the Committee recognized the government of Ignacy Jan Paderewski and dissolved itself.

Historical background

During World War I, many Polish people were determined to regain national independence after 123 years of occupation by Austria, Russia and Prussia, following the partitions of Poland. Towards the end of the war, a number of Polish organizations were established both within the partitioned state, and across the world. This caused concern for the Kaiser of Germany and the King-Emperor of Austria Hungary. On November 5, 1916, they passed an act proposing the creation of a Kingdom of Poland which was meant as a puppet state of the German Empire under control of the Central Powers. This act is known as the Act of 5th November. After its proclamation, different Polish political groups and organizations began to seek the support of Entente states in the hope rebuilding the Polish state. In August of the following year the Polish National Committee was established and continued its activities until 1919.

See also
 Yugoslav Committee
 Czechoslovak National Council
 Romanian National Committee (1918)

External links
 Roman Dmowski

 
Polish independence organisations
Aftermath of World War I in Poland
Poland in World War I
Political history of Poland
National Democracy
1917 establishments in Poland
1919 disestablishments in Poland